David Ernest Peckinpah (September 5, 1951 – April 23, 2006) was a television writer, producer and director. David was the nephew of film director Sam Peckinpah and son of Denver "Denny" Peckinpah, a Fresno County Superior Court Judge.  He was the writer and producer of several series including the cable TV shows DEA, Silk Stalkings, Sliders and Beauty and the Beast. He also had a number of series in development at the time of his death.

Sliders
Fox brought Peckinpah onto the television series Sliders in its third season. Peckinpah has been derided by fans, who argue that his involvement (and by extension Fox's more hands-on involvement) caused the show to "jump the shark".

Peckinpah is believed to be responsible for the departure of cast member John Rhys-Davies. While John Rhys-Davies had been an outspoken critic of the show's writing quality since the first season, Fox supported him; only David Peckinpah, who was assigned to the show in its third season, wanted him out. Rhys-Davies later vowed that he would not return to Sliders as long as Peckinpah had a hand in the show.

Sliders co-creator Tracy Tormé was highly critical of Sliders in its third season. When the show was cancelled and the show was picked up by the Sci-Fi Channel, Tormé attempted to retake control of the series. One of Tormé's conditions was the removal of David Peckinpah from the series. Peckinpah had already signed a two-year contract with Universal, and Universal elected to keep Peckinpah. Tormé left the series.

Personal life
David was married to actress and producer Sandy Peckinpah from 1974 until his death in 2006.  They had four children: Garrett (b. 1978 d. 1994), Trevor (born 1982), Julianne Belle (born 1988), and Jackson (born 1992).  Julianne was born with a bilateral cleft lip, which inspired David's wife to write books about children born with special needs.  Some books are "Rosey the Imperfect Angel," "Chester the Imperfect All-Star" (inspired by baseball pitcher Jim Abbott), and "Fairy Tale Life . . . Interrupted." David and Sandy were writing partners and co-founders of DASAN Productions.

The couple were very close friends with actors Melissa Gilbert and Bruce Boxleitner.  Melissa gave birth to a very premature son in October 1994.  She named him Michael Garrett Boxleitner (in honor of Michael Landon and Garrett Peckinpah). When Garrett was 16, he died suddenly from meningitis. Following the death of his first son, David relapsed into drug and alcohol abuse, after nearly 20 years of sobriety. In 2004 David began renting a home in Vancouver which he would use as a creative space for writing and production, commuting to and from his family home in California. However this arrangement proved to be tragic.

On April 23, 2006 David died of heart failure caused by drug overdose in Vancouver B.C. He was 55. Today his widow, Sandy, is a realtor and writer in Murrieta, California.

References

External links

1951 births
2006 deaths
American television directors
Television producers from California
American television writers
American male television writers
Writers from Fresno, California
Screenwriters from California
20th-century American screenwriters
20th-century American male writers